María Concepción Mendívil Feito  (born March 3, 1981 in Helsinki, Finland), better known as Conchita, is a Spanish singer and songwriter.

Discography

Albums

EPs
12 November 2010: Tocando Madera
2016: Prologue

Singles

References

External links 
  Official Site

Living people
1981 births
21st-century Spanish singers
21st-century Spanish women singers
Spanish people of Finnish descent
Finnish people of Spanish descent